Planning Theory is a quarterly peer-reviewed academic journal that covers the field of city planning and land development. The editor-in-chief is Michael Gunder (University of Auckland) . The journal was established in 2002 and is published by SAGE Publications.

Abstracting and indexing
The journal is abstracted and indexed in Scopus and the Social Sciences Citation Index. According to the Journal Citation Reports, its 2013 impact factor is 1.333, ranking it 20th out of 55 journals in the category "Planning and Development".

References

External links
 

SAGE Publishing academic journals
English-language journals
Publications established in 2002
Quarterly journals
Urban studies and planning journals